The Arboretum de la Foux (10 hectares), also known as the Arboretum de Saint-Sauveur-des-Pourcils, is an arboretum located within the Forêt de l'Aigoual near Saint-Sauveur-Camprieu, northwest of Le Vigan, Gard, Languedoc-Roussillon, France. It is open daily without charge.

The arboretum was created 1900-1910 for experimental introduction of foreign species into France. Scientific efforts ceased in 1963, and it has subsequently been maintained for educational purposes by the Office national des forêts. The site is on a southwest slope between 900 and 1500 metres altitude in an environment very conducive to forest vegetation; some trees reach heights that are records for Europe.

The arboretum's softwood collections include Abies cephalonica, Abies concolor, Abies grandis, Araucaria, Atlas Cedar, Nordmann Fir, European Larch and Japanese Larch, Pinus laricio; common Spruce, Oriental Spruce, Sitka Spruce, Picea pungens, and Engelmann Spruce; and Sequoia, Thuja plicata, and Tsuga heterophylla. Its hardwoods include ash, beech, birch, cherry, chestnut, red oak, and sycamore.

See also 
 List of botanical gardens in France

References 
 Esperou description (French)
 Parcs et Jardins entry (French)
 L'Echo des Chênaies - Arboretum de St Sauveur des Pourcils
 Causses-Aigoual-Cevennes description (French)
 Causses-Aigoual-Cevennes description (French)

Foux, Arboretum de la
Foux, Arboretum de la